James D. Swan (February 20, 1903 – June 25, 1977) was a vegetable farmer from Walworth County, Wisconsin who served two terms as a Republican member of the Wisconsin State Senate.

Background 
Swan was born in Neosho Falls, Kansas on February 20, 1903. He graduated from New Trier High School in Winnetka, Illinois, and earned a Bachelor of Science degree from Princeton University in 1925. He became a farmer, and served as President of the Wisconsin Potato and Vegetable Growers Association and of the Vegetable Growers Association of America.

Public office 
Swan had served as a member of his local school board and from 1937-52 of his county drainage board. He was first elected to the senate in an October 1967 special election to replace fellow Republican George M. Borg (who had resigned), and was reelected in 1970. In 1974, he was defeated for re-election by Democrat Timothy Cullen.

Death 
Swan died June 25, 1977 in Madison.

References 

1903 births
1977 deaths
Farmers from Wisconsin
Businesspeople from Wisconsin
People from Walworth County, Wisconsin
People from Woodson County, Kansas
Princeton University alumni
School board members in Wisconsin
Republican Party Wisconsin state senators
20th-century American businesspeople
20th-century American politicians